Chacarita Versalles is a Peruvian football club, playing in the city of Iquitos, Loreto, Peru.

History
The club have played at the highest level of Peruvian football on two occasions, from 1989 Torneo Descentralizado until 1990 Torneo Descentralizado when was relegated.

See also
List of football clubs in Peru
Peruvian football league system

External links
 Once Ideal: El ataque de los clones

Football clubs in Peru
Association football clubs established in 1942
1942 establishments in Peru